The Kooples is a French fashion retailer. As of 2014, they had 321 outlets in Europe. As of mid-2017, the company had 30 points of sale in the United States, including Bloomingdale's, and five stand-alone stores.

The company was founded by brothers Alexandre, Laurent and Raphaël Elicha.

References

External links
 
 

Kooples